Yoshida is a Japanese surname.

Yoshida may also refer to:

Places
Yoshida District, Fukui, a district, consisted of Eiheiji, Fukui
Yoshida, Ehime, a former town, merged to and currently a part of Uwajima, Ehime
Yoshida, Hiroshima, a former town, merged to and currently a part of Akitakata, Hiroshima
Yoshida, Kagoshima, a former town, merged to and currently a part of Kagoshima, Kagoshima
Yoshida, Niigata, a former town, merged to and currently a part of Tsubame, Niigata
Yoshida, Saitama, a former town, merged to and currently a part of Chichibu, Saitama
Yoshida, Shimane, a former village, merged to and currently a part of Unnan, Shimane
Yoshida, Shizuoka, a town in Shizuoka Prefecture

Other uses
Yoshida Shrine, a Shinto shrine in Kyoto

See also
Fujiyoshida, Yamanashi, a city in Yamanashi Prefecture
 YKK Group, originally Yoshida Kōgyō Kabushiki Gaisha
Yoshida Station (disambiguation)